Hartfield was a railway station serving Hartfield, England, on the Three Bridges to Tunbridge Wells Central Line which closed in 1967, a casualty of the Beeching Axe.

The station opened on 1 October 1866 and the buildings were designed by Charles Henry Driver.

The station building is now divided between a day nursery and a private house. The route of the railway line is now a cycle path (the Forest Way). A.A. Milne, the creator of Winnie-the-Pooh, lived in Hartfield.

The station appears in a British Transport Film entitled Farmer Moving South, which recounted the moving of the entire farm stock of Robert Ropner, by special train from Skutterskelfe Hall in Yorkshire to Perryhill Farm, Hartfield in December 1950. The entire move took 30 hours and was nine hours late in arriving at East Grinstead on 15 December. The film is available on a BFI DVD.

Gallery

See also 

 List of closed railway stations in Britain

References 

Disused railway stations in East Sussex
Former London, Brighton and South Coast Railway stations
Railway stations in Great Britain opened in 1866
Railway stations in Great Britain closed in 1967
Beeching closures in England
1866 establishments in England
Charles Henry Driver railway stations
railway station